Daniel Dupjačanec (born 15 July 1983) is a Macedonian handball player who plays for Handball Club Cournon-d'Auvergne and the Macedonia national handball team.

References
EHF profile

1983 births
Living people
Macedonian male handball players
Sportspeople from Prilep
Macedonian expatriate sportspeople in Iran
Macedonian expatriate sportspeople in Kosovo
Expatriate handball players